Sir Edward Shepherd Creasy (12 September 1812 – 17 January 1878) was an English historian and jurist.

Life
The son of a land agent, he was born in Bexley, Kent, England, and educated at Eton College (where he won the Newcastle Scholarship in 1831) and King's College, Cambridge. He was called to the Bar in 1837 and appointed assistant judge at the Westminster sessions court.

In 1840, he began teaching history at the University of London and wrote a number of historical books including The Fifteen Decisive Battles of the World (1851).

Creasy was knighted in 1860 and spent the next decade and a half in Ceylon as Chief Justice of Ceylon (1860 to 1875). He then returned in poor health to England and died in London on 17 January 1878.

Whilst in Ceylon, he served as president of the Ceylon Branch of the Royal Asiatic Society from 1861 to 1864. In July, 1864 Creasy founded the Colombo Rowing Club.

Works
Creasy's best known contribution to literature is his Fifteen Decisive Battles of the World (1851). The reason that Creasy gives for the significance of many of the fifteen battles is that they denied Eastern peoples access to European soil. Other battles are seen as "decisive" because they shaped the development of Britain, which was the world's leading power at the time of writing.

Other works are:
 Biographies of Eminent Etonians (1850) (several editions)
 Historical and Critical Account of the Several Invasions of England (1852);
 History of the Ottoman Turks, from the Beginning of Their Empire to the Present Time (1854)
 The Rise and Progress of the English Constitution (1855) (17th ed. 1886)
 History of England from the Earliest to the Present Time (5 vols.), 1869–70
 Imperial and Colonial Institutions of the Britannic Empire, Including Indian Institutions (1872)

Old Love and the New (1870) was a novel. With John Sheehan and Robert Gordon Latham, Creasy took part in contributing to Bentley's Miscellany, the political squibs in verse known as the Tipperary Papers.

References

External links
 
 
 
 

1812 births
1878 deaths
Military historians
Academics of the University of London
Alumni of King's College, Cambridge
Chief Justices of British Ceylon
Knights Bachelor
19th-century British historians
People educated at Eton College